Niret Alva is an Indian television producer who is the co-founder and chairman of television production company Miditech.

Miditech first made a documentary series on the environment, Living on the Edge for Doordarshan, and went on to make documentaries for the BBC, Discovery and National Geographic, before entering the entertainment genre around 2004, with  Indian Idol (2004–2009), Galli Galli Sim Sim (Sesame Street) (2006), and Wheels (1998) (BBC World).

Early life and education
Niret Alva was born in Bangalore – the first child of lawyers Niranjan and Margaret Alva. Alva has two brothers, Nikhil and Nivedith, and a sister, Manira, with whom he manages Miditech. His name is a portmanteau, wherein the first two letters are from his father Niranjan, and the last three from his mother, Margaret Alva. The family moved to Delhi in 1974 when his mother was elected to the Rajya Sabha (the upper house of India's parliament). She went on to serve as minister of state in Rajiv Gandhi and Narasimha Rao's governments. A prominent parliamentarian, she served four consecutive terms in the Rajya Sabha and one in the Lok Sabha.

Alva is a graduate in history from St. Stephen's College, Delhi, has a post graduate diploma in journalism from the Indian Institute of Mass Communication (IIMC), Delhi, and is a recipient of a certificate from the Radio Netherlands Training Centre in Hilversum (Holland) for a news and current affairs course in television. He earned a law degree (LLB) from Mumbai University.

Career
Alva joined the Press Trust of India, television, as a trainee reporter/scriptwriter in January 1988. Beginning his career when television was still government-controlled in the late 1980s, he moved on to become a correspondent with Eyewitness, a monthly independent video news magazine, owned by Hindustan Times Television in 1990. He covered subjects such as Indian attitudes toward sex, caste violence, the dangers of the civilian use of the army and the capture of Rajiv Gandhi's assassin.

In 1992, he co-founded Miditech, a television software production company, along with his brother Nikhil. Miditech's program, Living on the Edge, won a Panda award at Wildscreen in Bristol in 1996.

Alva has scripted, directed and been associated with several international, award winning documentaries, including The Great Descent –  a river rafting journey down the Brahmaputra after the massive flood of 2000, and Operation Hot Pursuit – an undercover documentary on the illegal ivory trade between India and Japan.

Awards
 National Award for 'Outstanding Effort in Science and Technology in the Electronic Medium', awarded by President APJ Abdul Kalam.
 Wildscreen Panda Award, better known as the Green Oscar, for Living On The Edge.
 Asian Television Award for best Anchor in an Information Based series for Wheels on BBC world. In 2019, Niret and Nikhil Alva and their production house Miditech was inducted into the Indian television Hall of Fame.

Personal life
Alva is married to Indian author and advertising executive Anuja Chauhan author of The Zoya Factor (2008) and five other best selling novels. They first met in 1989, during the production of a play in Delhi. They were married in 1994. They have three children, two girls and a boy.

Filmography

References

External links
 MidiTech, official website

Living people
Indian television producers
Indian male television journalists
St. Stephen's College, Delhi alumni
Indian television presenters
Businesspeople from Haryana
People from Gurgaon
Year of birth missing (living people)